Jure Bučar (born January 4, 1966 in Ljubljana) is a retired male freestyle swimmer from Slovenia. He represented his native country in three consecutive Summer Olympics, starting in 1992 (Barcelona, Spain).

References
sports-reference

External links
 

1966 births
Living people
Slovenian male freestyle swimmers
Olympic swimmers of Slovenia
Swimmers at the 1992 Summer Olympics
Swimmers at the 1996 Summer Olympics
Swimmers at the 2000 Summer Olympics
Sportspeople from Ljubljana
20th-century Slovenian people
21st-century Slovenian people